2gether: The Movie (The Movie,  'Because We Belong Together the Movie') is a 2021 Thai romantic comedy film based on a novel by JittiRain - 2gether: The Series and Still 2gether. It is directed by Weerachit Thongjila, Noppharnach Chaiwimol and Kanittha Kwanyu and produced by GMMTV with The One Enterprise. The film stars Vachirawit Chivaaree and Metawin Opas-iamkajorn

The film was originally set to be released theatrically in Thailand on 22 April 2021, but was postponed due to an upsurge of COVID-19 cases in the country. The film had its theatrical debut first in Japan on June 4, 2021, and was released in Thailand on November 11, 2021. It is later released on the Disney+ Hotstar streaming service in Thailand on February 11, 2022.

Cast 
 Metawin Opas-iamkajorn (Win) as Tine Teepakorn
 Vachirawit Chiva-aree (Bright) as Sarawat Guntithanon
 Korawit Boonsri (Gun) as Green
 Sivakorn Lertchuchot (Guy) as Dim
 Rachanun Mahawan (Film) as Earn
 Pattranite Limpatiyakorn (Love) as Pear
 Thanawat Rattanakitpaisan (Khaotung) as Fong
 Chayakorn Jutamat (JJ) as Ohm
 Chanagun Arpornsutinan (Gunsmile) as Boss
 Chinnarat Siriphongchawalit (Mike) as Man
 Sattabut Laedeke (Drake) as Mil
 Thanatsaran Samthonglai (Frank) as Phukong
 Jirakit Kuariyakul (Toptap) as Type

Original soundtrack

Album

2gether Special Album 
Credits adapted from Spotify and Line Music.

Singles

References 

2021 films
Thai-language films
GMMTV
2021 LGBT-related films
2021 romantic comedy-drama films
Thai romantic comedy-drama films
Gay-related films
LGBT-related romantic comedy-drama films
Thai LGBT-related films
Films postponed due to the COVID-19 pandemic